Jacky Hénin (born 12 November 1960 in Douai) is a French politician and Member of the European Parliament for the north-west of France. He is a member of the French Communist Party, which is part of the European United Left–Nordic Green Left group, and sits on the European Parliament's Committee on International Trade.

He is also member of the Committee on Industry, Research and Energy and a substitute for the delegation for relations with Belarus.

Career
 University diploma in business and administrative management (1982)
 Member of the French Communist Party national council
 Mayor of Calais (until 2008)
 Chairman of the Calaisis Urban Area Community Council
 Chairman, SEVADEC intercommunal services

External links
 Official website (in French)
 European Parliament biography
 Declaration of financial interests (in French; PDF file)

1960 births
Living people
MEPs for North-West France 2004–2009
MEPs for North-West France 2009–2014
French Communist Party politicians
French Communist Party MEPs
Lille University of Science and Technology alumni
People from Douai
Mayors of places in Hauts-de-France